Kwyet Kinks is the third EP by the English rock band the Kinks. In the United States, which had no corresponding market for EPs, Reprise Records instead used its songs as the basis for the November1965 LP Kinkdom. Driven by the inclusion of the song "A Well Respected Man", Kwyet Kinks topped sales charts in Britain for several weeks.

With its mostly acoustic sound, Kwyet Kinks represented a departure from the heavier rock for which the Kinks had become known, a change reflected in the title with its play on the word "quiet". Contemporary and retrospective coverage of the EP has typically focused on "A Well Respected Man", which marked a shift in bandleader Ray Davies's songwriting towards social commentary. Ray hoped that the success of Kwyet Kinks would allow for more EPs made up of exclusive material, but Pye's focus on the more popular singles market meant that future Kinks EPs instead collected previously released recordings.

Background and music 
The Kinks' singles and LPs from mid-1964 to mid-1965 were characterised by a focus on fast, gritty R&B and rock and roll. Kwyet Kinks marked a stylistic departure from the Kinks' earlier output by being mostly acoustic in sound, a change reflected in the title through its play on the word "quiet". Author Richie Unterberger describes the EP as generally folk rock. Shel Talmy produced while Alan MacKenzie likely engineered.

Dave Davies composed and sang the EP's lead track "Wait Till the Summer Comes Along", a country-tinged ballad featuring a twelve-string guitar. The song was the first by the Kinks written only by Dave, while his brother Ray Davies composed and sang the EP's remaining three songs. Contemporary and subsequent coverage of the EP has typically focused on Ray's song "A Well Respected Man", which signalled his shift in songwriting from basic sentiments about love towards satire and social commentary about contemporary British society. Among band biographers, Johnny Rogan writes that the song "Such a Shame" suggested the Kinks' transition from beat music to folk rock, while Nick Hasted writes that the appeals to comfort, familiarity and domestic life in "Don't You Fret" anticipated Ray's later songwriting.

Release and reception 

The release was the band's third UK EP and their second to feature entirely new material following the previous year's Kinksize Session. Critic Allen Evans reviewed the EP favourably in New Musical Express, writing that the band's softer sound proved as successful as their louder output. "A Well Respected Man" received regular airplay on UK radio stations, driving sales of Kwyet Kinks, which reached number one on both Record Retailer and Record Mirror magazines' EP charts.

One of the year's best sellers, Kwyet Kinks sales exceeded what was typical for an EP at that time. Prompted by the release's unexpected success, Ray promised in interviews that the Kinks would release more EPs satirising unconventional trends and fashions, hoping that the format would prove an ideal medium in developing his songwriting. As Pye's focus remained on the more profitable singles market, the label cancelled all planned EPs of new Kinks material and instead recycled older material on subsequent releases.

In addition, the label issued "A Well Respected Man" as a single on 4November. Though the band were unable to promote the single's release, it reached number13 on the Billboard Hot 100 chart. Reflecting on the situation decades later, Rogan characterises the decision by Pye to relegate "A Well Respected Man" to Kwyet Kinks rather than releasing it as a UK single as "[p]robably one of the greatest blunders in the Kinks' career".

Track listing
All tracks written by Ray Davies, except "Wait Till the Summer Comes Along" by Dave Davies. Track lengths according to AllMusic.

Side one
"Wait Till the Summer Comes Along" – 2:08
"Such a Shame" – 2:17

Side two
"A Well Respected Man" – 2:41
"Don't You Fret" – 2:42

Personnel 
According to band researcher Doug Hinman:

The Kinks
Ray Davieslead vocal, acoustic guitar; twelve-string guitar 
Dave Daviesbacking vocal, electric guitar; lead vocal 
Pete Quaifebass guitar
Mick Avorydrums

Production
Shel Talmyproducer
Alan MacKenzieengineer

Charts

Notes

References

Citations

Sources

External links 
 

1965 EPs
Albums produced by Shel Talmy
The Kinks EPs
Pye Records EPs